Mike O'Neill is a three-time All-American lacrosse player for Johns Hopkins University.

Career
O'Neill was inducted into the National Lacrosse Hall of Fame in 1993. O'Neill is third all time in Career Points at Hopkins.

He was awarded the NCAA Player of the year in 1978, as well as the most outstanding player in the 1978 NCAA Division I Men's Lacrosse Championship. O'Neill led Hopkins to the NCAA finals in 1977 as well.

O'Neill was an all-American prep player at Massapequa High School in New York.

O'Neill was an assistant coach at the University of Delaware in 1979, the University of North Carolina in 1980 and Brown University from 1981 to 1984.

Johns Hopkins University

See also
 Johns Hopkins Blue Jays men's lacrosse

References

Living people
American lacrosse players
Johns Hopkins Blue Jays men's lacrosse players
Year of birth missing (living people)
1978 in lacrosse
Massapequa High School alumni